Rodrigo Alcazar Faro (born 20 October 1973) is a Brazilian television presenter, actor and singer.

Career 
He started his career at the age of 9 in 1982 when he participated in a milk commercial. As a child he was a model and presenter of the children's program ZYB Bom on TV Bandeirantes.

At 19, he integrated the boyband Dominó, before graduating in radio and TV by the University of São Paulo. In 1996 he starred his first telenovela, Antônio Alves, Taxista, on SBT.

In 2008, he moved to RecordTV to present Ídolos. However, before making his debut in the musical reality, he was called to quickly replace presenter Márcio Garcia in O Melhor do Brasil.

Later in August he debuted as the presenter of Ídolos. Rodrigo stayed in charge of the program for four seasons, being succeeded by Marcos Mion in 2012. In 2012 Rodrigo presented the Fazenda de Verão, also on RecordTV.

In 2013, the presenter came to realize a dream; host a program on Sundays. O Melhor do Brasil left Saturday nights for Sunday afternoons to cover up the hole left by Gugu Liberato's program, which ended a week earlier than scheduled due to the Liberato's departure from Rede Record, and by program Tudo é Possível, when its last broadcast happened in December 2012. The program ended up having its name changed to Hora do Faro in 2014.

O Melhor do Brasil won Faro the Troféu Imprensa for five consecutive years in the category "Best TV Presenter or Animator". On September 27, 2015, Rodrigo became the godfather of singer Felipe Araújo, brother of late sertanejo universitário singer Cristiano Araújo.

Rodrigo is an exclusive artist of RecordTV and his most recent contract lasted until 2017.

Personal life 
Faro has three daughters: Clara, Maria and Helena who were born in 2006, 2008 and 2012, respectively, with fellow TV personality and ex-model Vera Viel. The couple has been together since 1997 and has been married since 2003. In their wedding rings is written "Forever, Vera" and "Forever, Rodrigo." According to Faro, it was love at first sight. Faro is Catholic, his mother, Vera Lúcia Alcazar Faro, is a university professor. Gil Vicente, Faro's father, was a dentist and split up from his wife when Rodrigo was 9 years old. Gil died when Faro was 13 years old and they had little contact.

Rodrigo has a blog on the Internet portal of RecordTV, R7.

Net worth 
In 2014, Rodrigo had his net worth valued at R$100 million (US$23 million) by Isto É magazine. As a presenter, he receives a monthly salary of R$2 million (US$478,572) from RecordTV. In addition, Rodrigo is also spokenperson of several brands, receiving per month around R$1.5 million (US$481,305) in advertising and merchandising, as calculated in 2016. His greatest year of income was 2013, when he earned R$45 million (US$10,767,870), including the contract valued at R$3 million (US$717.858) to star commercials for Chevrolet.

As of August 2018, his net worth is estimated to be R$133.5 million (around US$31.8 million in 2018 dollars).

Filmography

Television

Cinema

Discography

Albums

Singles
 As main artist

As featured artists

Other songs

References

External links

 

1973 births
Living people
Male actors from São Paulo
Brazilian television presenters
Brazilian male television actors
20th-century Brazilian male singers
20th-century Brazilian singers
Brazilian male dancers
20th-century Brazilian male actors
21st-century Brazilian male actors
21st-century Brazilian male singers
21st-century Brazilian singers